Do Rah-e Bahram Beygi (also Romanized as Do Rāh-e Bahrām Beygī; also known as Derā, Do Rāh, and Dorrā) is a village in Pataveh Rural District, Pataveh District, Dana County, Kohgiluyeh and Boyer-Ahmad Province, Iran. At the 2006 census, its population was 35, in 8 families.

References 

Populated places in Dana County